1910 in sports describes the year's events in world sport.

American football
College championship
 College football national champions – Harvard Crimson

Professional championship
 Ohio League champions – Shelby Blues and Shelby Tigers (shared)

Association football

England
 The Football League – Aston Villa 53 points, Liverpool 48, Blackburn Rovers 45, Newcastle United 45, Manchester United 45, Sheffield United 42
 FA Cup final – Newcastle United 2–0 Barnsley at Crystal Palace, London (replay following 1–1 draw at Crystal Palace)
 Manchester United moves from its venue at Bank Street to its present home Old Trafford
Germany
 National Championship – Karlsruher FV (0–0) 1–0 Holstein Kiel at Köln
 Foundation of FC St. Pauli (15 May)
Norway
 Foundation of Bærum SK (26 March)
Scotland
 Scottish Football League – Celtic
 Scottish Cup final – Dundee 2–1 Clyde at Ibrox Park (2nd replay, following 2–2 and 0–0 draws)
 Ayr United formed following a merger between Ayr Parkhouse and Ayr FC

Australian rules football
VFL Premiership
 St. Kilda achieves the worst start by a team that did not suffer a winless season, losing its first seventeen games before a huge upset over Carlton.
 Collingwood wins the 14th VFL premiership, defeating Carlton 9.7 (61) to 6.11 (47) at Melbourne Cricket Ground (MCG)

Bandy
Sweden
 Championship final – IFK Uppsala 2–0 IFK Stockholm

Baseball
World Series
 17–23 October — Philadelphia Athletics (AL) defeats Chicago Cubs (NL) to win the 1910 World Series by 4 games to 1

Boxing
Events
 22 February — Ad Wolgast outlasts Battling Nelson at Point Richmond, California, to win the World Lightweight Championship by a technical knockout after 40 rounds.
 4 July — in boxing's first "fight of the century", Jack Johnson knocks out the "great white hope" James J. Jeffries in round 15 to retain his World Heavyweight Championship title.
 15 October — World Middleweight Champion Stanley Ketchel is shot and killed at Conway, Missouri, by Walter Dipley, a jealous farm worker.  Ketchel is rated by many boxing historians as the best middleweight ever.  The title remains vacant until 1913.
Lineal world champions
 World Heavyweight Championship – Jack Johnson
 World Light Heavyweight Championship – vacant
 World Middleweight Championship – Stanley Ketchel → vacant
 World Welterweight Championship – vacant
 World Lightweight Championship – Battling Nelson → Ad Wolgast
 World Featherweight Championship – Abe Attell
 World Bantamweight Championship – Monte Attell

Canadian football
Grey Cup
 26 November — 2nd Grey Cup – University of Toronto Varsity Blues 16–7 Hamilton Tigers

Cricket
England
 County Championship – Kent
 Minor Counties Championship – Norfolk
 Most runs – Johnny Tyldesley 2265 @ 46.22 (HS 158)
 Most wickets – Razor Smith 247 @ 13.05 (BB 8–13)
 Wisden Cricketers of the Year – Harry Foster, Alfred Hartley, Charlie Llewellyn, Razor Smith, Frank Woolley
Australia
 Sheffield Shield – South Australia
 Most runs – Bert Kortlang 656 @ 131.20 (HS 197)
 Most wickets – Jack Saunders 49 @ 17.32 (BB 6–35)
India
 Bombay Triangular – Europeans shared with Parsees
New Zealand
 Plunket Shield – Auckland
South Africa
 Currie Cup – not contested
West Indies
 Inter-Colonial Tournament – Trinidad and Tobago

Cycling
Tour de France
 Octave Lapize (France) wins the 8th Tour de France

Figure skating
World Figure Skating Championships
 World Men's Champion – Ulrich Salchow (Sweden)
 World Women's Champion – Lily Kronberger (Hungary)
 World Pairs Champions – Anna Hübler and Heinrich Burger (Germany)

Golf
Major tournaments
 British Open – James Braid
 US Open – Alex Smith
Other tournaments
 British Amateur – John Ball
 US Amateur – William C. Fownes Jr.

Horse racing
England
 Grand National – Jenkinstown
 1,000 Guineas Stakes – Winkipop
 2,000 Guineas Stakes – Neil Gow
 The Derby – Lemberg
 The Oaks – Rosedrop
 St. Leger Stakes – Swynford
Australia
 Melbourne Cup – Comedy King
Canada
 King's Plate – Parmer
Ireland
 Irish Grand National – Oniche
 Irish Derby Stakes – Aviator
USA
 Kentucky Derby – Donau
 Preakness Stakes – Layminster
 Belmont Stakes – Sweep

Ice hockey
Stanley Cup
 15 March — Montreal Wanderers wins the NHA championship and the Stanley Cup. The club then defeats Berlin Dutchmen in a challenge. 
Events
 5 January — National Hockey Association (NHA) commences its inaugural season
 15 January — Canadian Hockey Association disbands. Ottawa and Montreal Shamrocks join the NHA.
 March — Toronto St. Michael's Majors wins the Allan Cup
 December — NHA loses its Cobalt and Haileybury teams, but gains a Quebec team. The Montreal Canadiens are taken over by George Kennedy's Club Athletique Canadien after threatening legal action.

Motorsport

Rowing
The Boat Race
 23 March — Oxford wins the 67th Oxford and Cambridge Boat Race

Rugby league
England
 Championship – Oldham
 Challenge Cup final – Leeds 26–12 Hull F.C. at Fartown Ground, Huddersfield (replay, following 7–7 draw at Fartown)
 Lancashire League Championship – Oldham
 Yorkshire League Championship – Wakefield Trinity
 Lancashire County Cup – Wigan 22–5 Leigh
 Yorkshire County Cup – Huddersfield 21–0 Batley
Australia
 17 September — the 1910 NSWRFL season culminates in a grand final between South Sydney and Newtown which is drawn 4–4. Newtown are crowned premiers by virtue of being minor premiers.

Rugby union
Five Nations Championship
 France joins the Home Nations Championship which is now called the Five Nations Championship
 28th Five Nations Championship series is won by England

Speed skating
Speed Skating World Championships
 Men's All-round Champion – Nikolay Strunnikov (Russia)

Tennis
Australia
 Australian Men's Singles Championship – Rodney Heath (Australia) defeats Horace Rice (Australia) 6–4 6–3 6–2
England
 Wimbledon Men's Singles Championship – Anthony Wilding (New Zealand) defeats Arthur Gore (GB) 6–4 7–5 4–6 6–2
 Wimbledon Women's Singles Championship – Dorothea Douglass Lambert Chambers (GB) defeats Dora Boothby (GB) 6–2 6–2
France
 French Men's Singles Championship – Maurice Germot (France) defeats François Blanchy (France): details unknown
 French Women's Singles Championship – Jeanne Matthey (France) defeats Marguerite Broquedis (France): details unknown
USA
 American Men's Singles Championship – William Larned (USA) defeats Tom Bundy (USA) 6–1 5–7 6–0 6–8 6–1
 American Women's Singles Championship – Hazel Hotchkiss Wightman (USA) defeats Louise Hammond (USA) 6–4 6–2
Davis Cup
 1910 International Lawn Tennis Challenge –  walkover

References

 
Sports by year